Raphael (born 1948) is an American musician and composer of ambient music.

Biography
Raphael F. Sharpe was born in Tulsa, Oklahoma in 1948. Raised by Benedictine nuns, when his family got ill, he learned classical music and Gregorian chant.

In 1967, he participated at the San Francisco Summer of Love, masquerading as a velvet-caped European count playing gypsy style violin. He studied piano at the San Francisco Conservatory. From there he moved to the Esalen Institute at Big Sur where he worked for ten years as a teacher and musician. There he started pursuing music as a therapy, mixing world rhythms and western music.

In 1988 he released 'Music To Disappear In' which sold over 500,000 copies.

In 1990, Raphael moved to Maui, Hawaii, and married Swiss-born psychotherapist Kutira Decosterd. They founded the Kahua Hawaiian Institute, where they perform musically and teach Oceanic Tantra.

In 1992, he founded Kahua Records, the label of his latest works.

Raphael's work are all published under his sole first name. Some websites refer to him as Raphael Decosterd (or Décosterd) but it seems to be his Swiss-born wife's last name. The Kahua Institute's website refers to him as Raphael F. Sharpe.

Discography

As a solo artist
 Music to Disappear In (1985) – Hearts of Space Records
 Music to Disappear In II (1991) – Hearts of Space Records
 Angels of the Deep (1994) – Hearts of Space Records
 Intimacy (Music for Love) (1996) – Hearts of Space Records

With Kutira
 Never Give Up! – Kahua Records
 Sacred Feminine Voices of Bhutan – Kahua Records
 The Calling – Kahua Records
 Like an Endless River – Kahua Records
 Prayer – Kahua Records
 Oceanic Trantra – Kahua Records
 The Opening – Kahua Records

With Wendy Grace
 Immaculate Heart – Kahua Records

With The Shaman Dancers
 The Lovers Within – Kahua Records

With Alan Cohen
 Journey to the Center of the Heart – Kahua Records

External links
 Kahua Records
 Raphael's Maui Eco Retreat

References

1948 births
Living people
American male composers
21st-century American composers
New-age musicians
Ambient musicians
21st-century American male musicians